The 2000 Asia-Pacific Rally Championship season was an international rally championship organized by the FIA. New Zealander Possum Bourne won his third and final APRC title driving a Subaru Impreza WRX.

Calendar

References

External links
Official website

Asia-Pacific Rally Championship seasons
Asia-Pacific Rally
Rally
Rally